Saltuarius wyberba, also known as the granite leaf-tailed gecko, is a gecko found in Australia. It is endemic to southeastern Queensland and northern New South Wales.

References

Saltuarius
Endemic fauna of Australia
Geckos of Australia
Reptiles described in 1997
Taxa named by Patrick J. Couper
Taxa named by Christopher J. Schneider (herpetologist)
Taxa named by Jeanette Covacevich